George Henry Swindlehurst MBE (1925-2009), also known as Ginger, was a former Paralympic athlete from Great Britain who competed in the early editions of the Paralympic Games, taking part in table tennis and wheelchair basketball. He was born in 1925 in Stockport.

He enlisted in the Coldstream Guards in 1943 at the age of 18. Whilst serving his country in Arnhem, Holland he was shot in the back and paralysed.

Paralympics career
In 1960, in Rome, Swindlehurst competed in the first Summer Paralympics as part of the men's wheelchair basketball team where he and the British team won silver in Men's Tournament Class A and he won bronze in men's doubles table tennis. In the 1964 Games in Tokyo, Swindlehurst won silver medals in both sports.

He competed in the men's wheelchair basketball tournaments right up to 1972. At the end of his sporting career he was awarded a Gold Medal Triad in 2000, as well as receiving an MBE.

References

Paralympic athletes of Great Britain
Paralympic silver medalists for Great Britain
Paralympic bronze medalists for Great Britain
Sportspeople from Stockport
1925 births
2009 deaths
Members of the Order of the British Empire
Medalists at the 1960 Summer Paralympics
Medalists at the 1964 Summer Paralympics
Paralympic medalists in table tennis
Paralympic medalists in wheelchair basketball
Table tennis players at the 1960 Summer Paralympics
Table tennis players at the 1964 Summer Paralympics
Wheelchair basketball players at the 1960 Summer Paralympics
Wheelchair basketball players at the 1964 Summer Paralympics
Paralympic wheelchair basketball players of Great Britain